The term mole men is commonly used to refer to mole people, real or fictional members of a subterranean society.

Mole Men or Mole People may also refer to:

Fictional characters 
 Mole Man, a super villain from Marvel comic books
 Hans Moleman, a character in The Simpsons
 Mole People, (or Moloids) of Subterranea, a fictional race of underground-dwellers in Marvel comic books
 Mole Men, a race of tall hairy beings from the comedy-action TV series Saul of the Mole Men

Books 
 The Mole People: Life In The Tunnels Beneath New York City

Films 
 Superman and the Mole Men a 1951 film
 The Mole People (film), (1956) horror film
 Mole Men Against the Son of Hercules a 1961 sword and sandal film

Music 
 Molemen (producers), a trio of Hip Hop producers from Chicago, Illinois

Nicknames 
 Engineer William Lyttle (1931-2010), nicknamed "The Mole Man of Hackney" by local press